Roy Ward Baker (born Roy Horace Baker; 19 December 1916 – 5 October 2010) was an English film director. His best known film is A Night to Remember (1958) which won a Golden Globe for Best English-Language Foreign Film in 1959. His later career included many horror films and television shows.

Early life and career
Born in London where his father was a Billingsgate fish merchant, Baker was educated at a Lycée in Rouen, France, and at the City of London School.

Career 
From 1934 to 1939, Baker worked for Gainsborough Pictures, a British film production company based in the Islington district of London. His first jobs were menial, making tea for crew members, for example, but by 1938 he had risen to the level of assistant director on Alfred Hitchcock's The Lady Vanishes (1938).

He served in the Army during the Second World War, transferring to the Army Kinematograph Unit in 1943 to make better use of his skills as a production manager and director on documentaries. One of his superiors at the time was novelist Eric Ambler, who insisted on Baker being given his first big break directing The October Man, from an Ambler screenplay, in 1947. Ambler also adapted Walter Lord's A Night to Remember for Baker's 1958 screen version. His next two films, The Weaker Sex (1948) and Paper Orchid (1949) were popular but overshadowed by the success of Morning Departure (1950), also featuring John Mills.

Morning Departure drew international attention to Baker's talent and prompted Darryl Zanuck, production head of 20th Century Fox, to invite him to Hollywood, though his first film for the company - I'll Never Forget You - was made in the UK. During the early 1950s, Baker worked for three years at Fox where he directed Marilyn Monroe in Don't Bother to Knock (1952) and Robert Ryan in the 3D film noir Inferno (1953). He returned to the UK in 1953 and continued to work on films.

He worked for television during the 1960s and early 1970s. He directed episodes of The Avengers, The Saint, The Persuaders!,  The Champions, Randall and Hopkirk (Deceased) - all of them adventure series created with an eye on the American market. His experience of working with low budgets in television made him well suited to his next career move into cheaply produced but lavish-looking British horror films. He directed, among others, Quatermass and the Pit (1967) The Vampire Lovers (1970) and Scars of Dracula (1970) for Hammer, and Asylum (1972) and The Vault of Horror (1973) for Amicus. He also directed Bette Davis in the black comedy The Anniversary (1968), and co-directed (with renowned Hong Kong director Chang Cheh) the Hammer-Shaw Brothers Studio collaboration The Legend of the 7 Golden Vampires.

In the latter part of the 1970s he returned to television, and throughout the 1980s continued to work on shows such as Minder. He retired in 1992.

In 2000, Baker published his memoirs, Director's Cut: A Memoir of 60 Years in Film, and in 2002 sold his production files and letters at auction.

He contributed interviews to several DVD extras, such as the extras included with The Saint and Randall & Hopkirk - Deceased  and took part in the 2007 BBC 2 documentary series British Film Forever, and in Mark Gatiss's October 2010 BBC 4 series, A History of Horror, in which he gave his final recorded interview.

Personal life 
Ward was married to Muriel Bradford from 1940 to 1944. In 1948, he married Joan Dixon, with whom he had a son. They divorced in 1984.

Death 
Baker died on 5 October 2010, aged 93.

Partial filmography

 The October Man (1947)
 The Weaker Sex (1948)
 Paper Orchid (1949)
 Morning Departure (1950)
 Highly Dangerous (1950)
 I'll Never Forget You (1951)
 Don't Bother to Knock (1952)
 Night Without Sleep (1952)
 Inferno (1953)
 Passage Home (1955)
 Jacqueline (1956)
 Tiger in the Smoke (1956)
 The One That Got Away (1957)
 A Night to Remember (1958)
 The Singer Not the Song (1961)
 Flame in the Streets (1961)
 The Valiant (1962)
 Two Left Feet (1963)
 Quatermass and the Pit (1967)
 The Anniversary (1968)
 The Fiction Makers (1968)
 Moon Zero Two (1969)
 The Spy Killer (1969)
 Foreign Exchange (1970)
 The Vampire Lovers (1970)
 Scars of Dracula (1970)
 Journey to Midnight (1971)
 Dr. Jekyll and Sister Hyde (1971)
 Asylum (1972)
 The Vault of Horror (1973)
 And Now the Screaming Starts! (1973)
 The Legend of the 7 Golden Vampires (1974)
 The Monster Club (1981)
 The Flame Trees of Thika (1981, TV series)
 The Masks of Death (1984)

References

Bibliography
Baker, Roy Ward (2000) Director's Cut: A Memoir of 60 Years in Film and Television. Reynolds and Hearn.

External links
 
 
 

1916 births
2010 deaths
British Army personnel of World War II
British Army soldiers
Horror film directors
People educated at the City of London School
Film directors from London
Military personnel from London